Edward John Megarr (born March 20, 1927) is a retired major general in the United States Marine Corps who served as commanding general of the 4th Marine Division.

References

1927 births
Possibly living people
United States Marine Corps generals